Patricia Ann McGowan Wald (September 16, 1928 – January 12, 2019) was an American judge who served as the Chief United States circuit judge of the United States Court of Appeals for the District of Columbia Circuit (D.C. Circuit) and as a judge of the International Criminal Tribunal for the Former Yugoslavia. She was the first woman to be appointed to the D.C. Circuit and the first to serve as Chief Judge of that court. She served as a member of the American Bar Association's International Criminal Court Project and on the Council of the American Law Institute.

Early life
Wald was born in Torrington, Connecticut, to Joseph F. McGowan and Margaret O'Keefe on September 16, 1928, as their only child. Her father left the family when she was two years old, and Wald was raised by her mother, with the company and support of extended relatives, most of whom were factory workers in Torrington and active union members. Wald had a Roman Catholic upbringing, and worked in brass mills as a teenager during the summers. Due to her involvement in the labor movement and union work, she determined to go to law school to help protect underprivileged, working-class people.

Education
Wald attended Torrington's St. Francis School and graduated in 1940. She then went on to graduate from Torrington High School in 1944 as the class valedictorian. She graduated first in her class and joined the Phi Beta Kappa society at the Connecticut College for Women (now Connecticut College) in 1948. She was able to attend Connecticut College for Women because of a scholarship that she received from an elderly affluent woman from her hometown. She then received a national fellowship from the Pepsi-Cola Company that allowed her to go on and earn her law degree from Yale Law School in 1951. She graduated with only 11 other women that year out of a class of 200. Along with the national fellowship, Wald also paid for law school by working as a waitress and taking research jobs with professors. At Yale, she was an editor on the Yale Law Journal, one of the two women in her class so honored.

After her graduation, she clerked for Judge Jerome Frank of the United States Court of Appeals for the Second Circuit for a year. That year, Frank ruled on the appeal of the espionage convictions of Ethel and Julius Rosenberg. She briefly entered private practice at the influential law firm Arnold, Fortas & Porter for a year before she left to raise her five children.

Professional career
It would be six years before she would take on part-time consulting and researching positions. She was a research and editorial assistant for Frederick M. Rowe, Esq. for three years from 1959 to 1962. She took a year off and then in 1963 spent a year as a member of the National Conference on Bail and Criminal Justice. Wald then worked as a consultant for the National Conference on Law & Poverty in its Office of Economic Opportunity. In 1964, she co-authored the book Bail in the United States, which helped reform the nation's bail system. She then was appointed to the President's Commission on Crime in the District of Columbia from 1965 to 1966 by President Lyndon B. Johnson. She continued her consulting work for the President's Commission on Law Enforcement & Administration of Criminal Justice for a year.

Wald then joined the United States Department of Justice in 1967 and spent a year as an attorney in the Office of Criminal Justice. From 1968 to 1970, she was an attorney at Neighborhood Legal Services in Washington, D.C. During her tenure at Neighborhood Legal Services Program she was also a consultant for both the National Advisory Committee on Civil Disorder and the National Commission on the Causes and Prevention of Violence. She also co-directed the Ford Foundation's Drug Abuse Research Project during 1970. She then became an attorney at the Center for Law and Social Policy from 1971 to 1972 and from there switched to work as an attorney at the Mental Health Law Project for five years. During that time, she was also the director of the Office of Policy and Issues in the vice presidential campaign of Sargent Shriver. Wald then went back to the Department of Justice from 1977 to 1979. A Democrat, she served as Assistant Attorney General for Legislative Affairs during much of the Carter administration before being nominated by Carter to the DC Circuit.

Federal judicial service
Wald was nominated by President Jimmy Carter on April 30, 1979, to the United States Court of Appeals for the District of Columbia Circuit, to a new seat created by 92 Stat. 1629. The Carter administration created a set of guidelines to be used by the United States Circuit Judge Nominating Commission that was geared to be friendlier towards women in an effort to increase the number of female federal judges. She was confirmed by the United States Senate on July 24, 1979, and received her commission on July 26, 1979. She served as Chief Judge from 1986 to 1991. She was the first woman to be appointed to the District of Columbia Circuit and was also the first woman to serve as its chief judge.

In 1994, Wald became involved with American Bar Association's (ABA) Central European and Eurasian Law Initiative, where she attempted to aid new Eastern European democracies rebuild their legal systems after the fall of the Soviet Union.

Post judicial service
After retiring from the federal judiciary, Wald was the United States's representative to the International Criminal Tribunal for the Former Yugoslavia from 1999 to 2002. She presided over numerous cases of people accused of genocide. Some of the accused included those involved in the Srebrenica massacre. On February 6, 2004, Wald was appointed by President Bush to the President's Commission on Intelligence Capabilities of the U.S. Regarding Weapons of Mass Destruction, an independent panel tasked with investigating U.S. intelligence surrounding the United States' 2003 invasion of Iraq and Iraq's weapons of mass destruction. The commission was co-chaired by Laurence Silberman, a fellow judge who worked with Wald on the bench of the District of Columbia Circuit Court. Silberman had a great deal of respect for Wald despite their ideological differences and did not hesitate to recommend her appointment to the bi-partisan commission. Wald agreed to serve on the Constitution Project's Guantanamo Task Force in December 2010.

In August 2012, Wald was confirmed by the Senate as a member of the Privacy and Civil Liberties Oversight Board after being nominated by President Barack Obama. On December 12, 2013, the Senate invoked cloture on her nomination by a 57–41 vote, thus cutting off a filibuster that had been led by Republican senators. Later that same day, Wald was confirmed by a 57–41 vote. However, Wald left the Board in January 2017.

She served as chair of the board of directors of the Open Society Justice Initiative and was a member of the board of directors for Mental Disability Rights International. She also continued to serve on the board of the American Bar Association's International Criminal Court Project. Wald was a member of the global council of the California International Law Center at the University of California, Davis School of Law. She was also a member of the American Law Institute, the American Philosophical Society, and the Whitney R. Harris World Law Institute's International Council.

Personal life
Patricia Wald was married to Robert Lewis Wald, who was also a Yale Law School graduate. They were married in 1951, when Patricia was 23; they had met in Europe as they were both traveling the continent. Together they had three daughters and two sons within the span of seven years: Sarah, Doug, Johanna, Frederica, and Thomas. Robert Wald died on September 7, 2010. Wald died in Washington, D.C., on January 12, 2019, from pancreatic cancer, aged 90.

Honors and awards
Wald was awarded more than 20 honorary degrees, and in 2002 was honored for her lifelong commitment to Human Right by the International Human Rights Law Group. She also was the recipient of the Margaret Brent Award of the National Association of Women Judges for achieving professional excellence in her field and influencing other women to pursue legal careers. Wald received the American Lawyer Hall of Fame Lifetime Achievement Award in 2004 and then four years later in 2008, she was awarded the American Bar Association Medal, the highest honor awarded by the ABA. She also was recognized by the Constitution Project as the 2011 Constitutional Champion. On November 20, 2013, Wald was awarded the Presidential Medal of Freedom, the nation's highest civilian honor.

See also
List of first women lawyers and judges in Washington D.C. (Federal District)

References

External links

|-

|-

1928 births
2019 deaths
20th-century American judges
American judges of United Nations courts and tribunals
Connecticut College alumni
Constitution Project
Deaths from cancer in Washington, D.C.
Deaths from pancreatic cancer
International Criminal Tribunal for the former Yugoslavia judges
Judges of the United States Court of Appeals for the D.C. Circuit
Lawyers from Washington, D.C.
Members of the American Law Institute
People from Torrington, Connecticut
Presidential Medal of Freedom recipients
United States Assistant Attorneys General
United States court of appeals judges appointed by Jimmy Carter
United States Department of Justice lawyers
American women legal scholars
Yale Law School alumni
20th-century American women judges